Gheorghe Minea (born 22 June 1959) is a Romanian wrestler. He competed in the men's Greco-Roman 74 kg at the 1980 Summer Olympics.

References

External links
 

1959 births
Living people
Romanian male sport wrestlers
Olympic wrestlers of Romania
Wrestlers at the 1980 Summer Olympics
Place of birth missing (living people)